Several Canadian naval units have been named HMCS Charlottetown after the provincial capital of Prince Edward Island. Uniquely in Canadian naval history, two of these vessels had the same name and pennant number.

 , a  commissioned on 13 December 1941 and torpedoed and sunk in the St. Lawrence River on 11 September 1942.
 , a   commissioned on 28 April 1944 and decommissioned on 25 March 1947.
 , a  commissioned in 1996.

Battle honours
Atlantic, 1942
Gulf of St. Lawrence, 1942, 1944.
Arabian Sea

References

Directorate of History and Heritage - HMCS Charlottetown 

Royal Canadian Navy ship names